The Chinese American Service League (CASL) is non-profit agency based in Chicago, Illinois. It provides social services such as English language classes, job training, and child care for Chinese American immigrants. CASL was started by Ms. Bernie Wong in 1982. In 1998, CASL sponsored and opened the Senior Housing Facility. In 2007, the non-profit built a new headquarters in Chinatown, Chicago

See also
 Chinese in Chicago

References

Asian-American culture in Chicago
Chinese-American culture in Illinois
Chinese-American organizations
Asian-American organizations